Sarah Williams may refer to:

People
Sarah Williams (poet), English poet and novelist
Sarah Williams (screenwriter), English screenwriter
Sarah-Rose Williams, member of the New York City Ballet
Sarah Wescot-Williams (born 1956), Sint Maarten politician
Sarah Anne Williams, American voice actress
Sarah Furman Warner Williams (1764–1848), American embroider and quiltmaker

Characters
Sarah Williams (Labyrinth), the main character of the 1986 film Labyrinth, played by Jennifer Connelly
Sarah Williams, a character of the 2000 film Waking the Dead, also played by Jennifer Connelly